Carl Oscar Johan Lewicki (born 14 July 1992) is a Swedish footballer who plays as a midfielder for the Allsvenskan club Malmö FF.

Born in Malmö, Lewicki started off his career with Malmö FF before joining FC Bayern Munich's youth organization in 2008. In 2011, Lewicki returned to his native Sweden to play for BK Häcken. In 2015, he rejoined his boyhood club Malmö FF with which he has won the 2016, 2017, 2020, and 2021 Allsvenskan titles.

A full international since 2014, Lewicki has won 15 caps for the Sweden national team and was a squad player for his country at UEFA Euro 2016.

Club career

Bayern Munich
Lewicki joined FC Bayern Munich from his native Malmö FF in 2008 and settled into their youth setup. He was first involved with Bayern's reserve team towards the end of the 2009–10 season appearing as an unused substitute in a number of matches as the season drew to a close. He made his debut at the beginning of the following season in a 4–1 defeat against Kickers Offenbach and made 33 appearances as the club got relegated from the 3. Liga. He was offered a pro-contract at the first team but declined. In June 2011 he became a free agent.

BK Häcken
Despite of FC Bayern Munich's efforts of wanting to re-sign him Lewicki chose to join Swedish side BK Häcken in August 2011 after having penned a contract lasting through to the year of 2014. The main reason for the switch was due to the presumable lack of first-team football in the near future with the German team. Lewicki spent four seasons at Häcken before leaving the club at the end of his contract in 2014.

Malmö FF
Lewicki's first club Malmö FF announced that he would return to the club on a three-year contract on 13 November 2014. The transfer went through when the Swedish transfer window opened on 8 January 2015.

International career
After having represented the Sweden U17 and U19 teams, Lewicki was a vital part of the Sweden U21 team that won the 2015 UEFA European Under-21 Championship and was selected to the Team of the Tournament.

He made his full international debut for Sweden on 17 January 2014 in a friendly game against Moldova. He made his competitive debut for Sweden on 9 October 2015 in a UEFA Euro 2016 qualifier against Liechtenstein, coming on as a substitute for Albin Ekdal in the 66th minute. He played in all 180 minutes as Sweden eliminated Denmark in the UEFA Euro 2016 qualifying play-offs after winning 4–3 on aggregate in two games.

Lewicki was a squad member for Sweden at UEFA Euro 2016 and played in two games before Sweden was eliminated in the group stage.

After Euro 2016, Lewicki was out of the national team for the 2018 World Cup cycle. Between 2019 and 2021 he was once again selected for the national team on several occasions, but had to withdraw with various injuries.

Personal life 
He is the son of Anders Lewicki, who made two Allsvenskan appearances for Malmö FF in 1987.

Career statistics

Club
Updated 8 December 2021.

International

Updated 11 January 2018.

Honours
Malmö FF
 Allsvenskan: 2016, 2017, 2020, 2021
 Svenska Cupen: 2021–22

Sweden U21
 UEFA European Under-21 Championship: 2015
Individual
 UEFA European Under-21 Championship - Team of the Tournament: 2015

References

External links
 Malmö FF profile 
 
 

1992 births
Living people
Swedish footballers
Swedish people of Polish descent
Sweden under-21 international footballers
FC Bayern Munich II players
BK Häcken players
Malmö FF players
3. Liga players
Allsvenskan players
Swedish expatriates in Germany
Expatriate footballers in Germany
Sweden youth international footballers
Sweden international footballers
UEFA Euro 2016 players
Footballers from Malmö
Association football midfielders
Association football defenders